William Walter Andrews  (September 18, 1859 – January 20, 1940), was a professional baseball player who played catcher in the Major Leagues for the Louisville Colonels.

In 1887, with the minor league Memphis Browns, Andrews hit .422 with 218 hits, 143 runs scored, 28 home runs and 52 stolen bases in 111 games.

External links

1859 births
1940 deaths
Major League Baseball catchers
Louisville Eclipse players
Louisville Colonels players
19th-century baseball players
Columbus Stars (baseball) players
Syracuse Stars (minor league baseball) players
Memphis Grays players
Memphis Browns players
Omaha Omahogs players
Omaha Lambs players
Baseball players from Pennsylvania